Suifenhe Dongning Airport  is an airport located in Suiyang town of Dongning county-city in Heilongjiang province of Northeast China, in 24 km to the west from Suifenhe city near the Russian border. The field verification test flight was carried out on 16 September 2021.  As of May 2022, no scheduled flights operate from the airport.

Facilities
The airport has a 2,500-meter runway, a 4,500 square-meter terminal building, and 14 aircraft parking places. It is designed to handle 450,000 passengers and 3,600 tons of cargo annually by 2025.

See also
List of airports in China
List of the busiest airports in China

References

Airports in Heilongjiang
Proposed airports in China